Michał Łabędzki (born September 24, 1980) is a retired Polish footballer.

Career

At the beginning of his career, he played for ŁKS Łódź. In 2002, he moved to the Piotrcovia Piotrków Trybunalski, which played one season. Then he played for three seasons in Pogoń Szczecin. In 2006, he returned on loan to ŁKS Łódź. In 2006, he joined Górnik Łęczna. Then he played for two seasons in Arka Gdynia. In 2009, he joined Zagłębie Lubin.

In the summer 2010 he moved to ŁKS Łódź.

References

Notes 
 

Polish footballers
Polish beach soccer players
1980 births
ŁKS Łódź players
Footballers from Łódź
Arka Gdynia players
Zagłębie Lubin players
Pogoń Szczecin players
Olimpia Grudziądz players
Living people
Association football defenders
Association football midfielders